The following is a list of notable Kennedy family members, arranged by birth date:

 P. J. Kennedy (1858–1929) businessperson
 Joseph P. Kennedy Sr. (1888–1969) businessperson, politician
 Rose Kennedy (1890 –1995) philanthropist, socialite, family matriarch
 Joseph P. Kennedy Jr. (1915–1944) U.S. Navy pilot
 Sargent Shriver (1915–2011) diplomat, politician, activist
 John F. Kennedy (1917–1963) 35th president of the United States
 Rosemary Kennedy (1918–2005) sister of John F. Kennedy
 Kathleen Cavendish, Marchioness of Hartington, née Kennedy, also known as Kick Kennedy (1920–1948) socialite
 Eunice Kennedy Shriver (1921–2009) philanthropist
 Patricia Kennedy Lawford (1924–2006) socialite
 Robert F. Kennedy, also known as RFK and Bobby (1925–1968) lawyer, politician
 Jean Kennedy Smith (1928–2020) diplomat, activist, and humanitarian
 Ethel Kennedy née Skakel (born 1928)
 Jacqueline Kennedy Onassis (1929–1994) First Lady of the United States
 Ted Kennedy (1932–2009) lawyer, politician
 Joseph P. Kennedy II (born 1952) businessperson, politician
 Maria Shriver (born 1955) journalist, author, former First Lady of California
 David A. Kennedy (1955–1984) son of Robert F. Kennedy
 Christopher Kennedy Lawford (1955–2018) actor, actor, activist
 Caroline Kennedy (born 1957) author, diplomat
 Michael LeMoyne Kennedy (1958–1997) lawyer, businessperson.
 Kara Kennedy (1960–2011) filmmaker, television producer
 John F. Kennedy Jr. (1960–1999) lawyer, journalist, magazine publisher
 Carolyn Bessette-Kennedy (1966–1999) publicist
 Patrick J. Kennedy (born 1967) politician, mental health advocate
 Maeve Kennedy McKean (1979–2020) public health official, human rights attorney, academic

See also 
 List of lists of political families

References 

 
American families of Irish ancestry
Business families of the United States
First Families of the United States
Roman Catholic families
County Wexford
Irish-American culture
Irish-American history
Massachusetts Democrats
People from Barnstable, Massachusetts
People from Boston
People from Brookline, Massachusetts